Tapani Aimo Vuorenhela (born 15 September 1947) is a Finnish former racing cyclist. He won the Finnish national road race title in 1971. He also competed in the individual road race at the 1972 Summer Olympics.

References

External links
 

1947 births
Living people
Finnish male cyclists
People from Somero
Olympic cyclists of Finland
Cyclists at the 1972 Summer Olympics
Sportspeople from Southwest Finland